Rahsaan Rahsaan is a live album by jazz multi-instrumentalist Rahsaan Roland Kirk featuring performances recorded at the Village Vanguard in May 1970. It was originally released on the Atlantic label in 1970 and features performances by Kirk with Rahn Burton, Vernon Martin, James Madison and Joe Habad Texidor with Dick Griffin, Howard Johnson, Leroy Jenkins, Sonelius Smith and Alvern Bunn added on an extended track. The Allmusic review by Thom Jurek states "Rahsaan was the king of the riff—he could use it until it bit you—and once it did he was off and running someplace else, down on the hard-swinging outer spaceways of his mind and heart".

Track listing
All compositions by Roland Kirk except as indicated.
 "The Seeker: Black Classical Rap / The Seeker / Thank You, Bird / New Orleans" – 17:18
 "Satin Doll" (Duke Ellington, Johnny Mercer, Billy Strayhorn) – 2:17
 "Introduction" – 1:38
 Medley: "Going Home" (Antonín Dvořák) / "Sentimental Journey" (Les Brown, Bud Green, Ben Homer) / "In Monument" / "Lover" (Richard Rodgers, Lorenz Hart) – 4:46
 "Sweet Fire" – 6:10
 "Introduction" – 3:19
 "Baby Let Me Shake Your Tree" – 4:54
Recorded in NYC on May 11 (track 1) and at the Village Vanguard, NYC on May 12 (tracks 3-7) & 15 (track 2), 1970

Personnel
Roland Kirk: tenor saxophone, manzello, stritch, clarinet, flute, miscellaneous instruments
Dick Griffin: trombone (track 1) 
Howard Johnson: tuba (track 1)
Leroy Jenkins: violin (track 1)
Rahn Burton: piano
Sonelius Smith: celesta, piano (track 1)
Vernon Martin: bass
James Madison: drums
Alvern Bunn: congas (track 1)
Joe Habao Texidor: tambourine, chime tree

References

Rahsaan Roland Kirk live albums
1970 live albums
Atlantic Records live albums
Albums recorded at the Village Vanguard